Germantown station may refer to:

Germantown station (MARC), a MARC Train station in Germantown, Maryland
Germantown station (SEPTA), a SEPTA station in Philadelphia, Pennsylvania

See also
Germantown (disambiguation)